The Cinema Travellers is a 2016 documentary film about the travelling cinemas of India, directed by Shirley Abraham and Amit Madheshiya. The film is produced by Cave Pictures, India, a company co-founded by Shirley Abraham and Amit Madheshiya in 2015. It was pitched at the 2013 Sheffield Doc/Fest MeetMarket. The film premiered as an Official Selection at the 2016 Cannes Film Festival and won L'Œil d'or Special Mention: Le Prix du documentaire. In 2016, it was the only Indian film playing as an Official Selection at Cannes.

Story 
Showmen riding cinema lorries have brought the wonder of the movies to faraway villages in India once every year. Seven decades on, as their cinema projectors crumble and film reels become scarce, their patrons are lured by slick digital technology. A benevolent showman, a shrewd exhibitor and a maverick projector mechanic bear a beautiful burden - to keep the last travelling cinemas of the world running.

Film festivals 

The Cinema Travellers had its world premiere on 15 May 2016 at the Salle Buñuel in the Palais des Festival at 2016 Cannes Film Festival. Following that, the film has been invited to play at 2016 Toronto International Film Festival, and 2016 New York Film Festival, becoming the only Indian documentary film to achieve this rare trifecta of topmost film festivals.

Reception 
The Cinema Travellers premiered at Cannes Film Festival to a rousing response. The first audiences of the film gave it a standing ovation. Glowing press reviews followed. Graham Fuller of Screen Daily declared, "Whatever masterpieces, if any, bow at this year’s Cannes Film Festival, it is likely none will communicate the excitement engendered by movies more headily than The Cinema Travellers."  He lauded the film for being "rigorous, aesthetically and intellectually." E. Nina Rothe of The Huffington Post called it a "masterpiece," and further, "a film from the heart and a testament to everything humanity should believe in wholeheartedly." Nick Schager of Variety found the film an "intimate, poignant documentary." Schager wrote, "Recalling Giuseppe Tornatore’s 1988 Oscar winner "Cinema Paradiso" in its effusive love of 20th-century celluloid splendor, this five-years-in-the-making film should entice theatrical-loving cinephiles." The film’s narrative form drew attention from reviewers. Benjamin Lee of The Guardian gave it four stars and wrote "There’s not a moment that feels forced or tweaked to ensure an emotional beat gets checked off, which results in both immersion and authenticity at every stage of the film." He summed up the film as "evocative, subtle and heartfelt". David Ehrlich of Indiewire called the film, "wise and wistful." Alex Ritman of The Hollywood Reporter wrote, "Its triumph lies in how it also captures the magic of this unique, collective movie-watching experience." Rating the film 9.5 on 10, Alex Billington of First Showing found the film, "jaw dropping," and wrote, "Everyone else who loves the cinematic experience as much as I do needs to revel in the glory of this doc."Tom Brook of BBC Talking Movies interviewed the directors in Cannes and included the film in his special coverage from the festival. LA Times included the film in its wrap-up report from Cannes calling it one of "The most involving films on film history."

Awards

References

External links 
 The Cinema Travellers: Official Website
 
 The Cinema Travellers on Facebook
 The Cinema Travellers on Twitter

2016 films
Documentary films about the cinema of India